Antônio Olinto dos Santos Pires (15 December 1860 – 25 February 1925) was the first president of the state of Minas Gerais in Brazil.

Political career
He founded the Minas Republican Party with João Pinheir.

He served as president of Minas Gerais from 17 November 1889 to 24 November 1889, was then a member of the government from 1890 to 1893 and minister of transportation from 1894 to 1896.

Writing
He directed the Estado de Minas and the Movement newspapers and collaborated on a Historical and Geographical Dictionary of Brazil/

References

1860 births
1925 deaths
Governors of Minas Gerais